Diogo Dias, also known as Diogo Gomes, was a 15th-century Portuguese explorer. He was the brother of Bartolomeu Dias and discovered some of the Cape Verde islands together with António Noli.

Serving with da Gama
In 1497 on the first Portuguese India Armadas expedition to India, Diogo Dias served as escrivão (clerk) aboard Vasco da Gama's flagship São Gabriel. Dias was one of the main conduits between Gama and the Zamorin of Calicut, and was briefly taken prisoner by the Zamorin when negotiations became contentious.

In 1500, Diogo Dias accompanied the 2nd armada of Pedro Álvares Cabral as one of the captains of the fleet, with a commission to open trade at Sofala.  Diogo Dias was one of the first to go ashore in the discovery of Brazil in April 1500. Famously, Dias is credited for breaking the ice with the wary Tupiniquim on the beach by jumping into an impromptu joyful dance to the accompaniment of Tupi pipes.

New waters
During an expedition along the Cape of Good Hope (Diogo may have originally called it the Cape of Storms) with Pedro Álvares Cabral and his brother, Dias's ship got separated from the main fleet during the crossing of Cape of Good Hope (his brother's ship was lost during that crossing).  Having struck a route too far east, Dias was the first European to sight the island of Madagascar and is often credited with naming the island of São Lourenço, on account of it being found on St. Lawrence's day (10 August 1500). Although the island was not unknown; its existence and Arabic name, "Island of the Moon", was already reported by Pêro da Covilhã back in 1490.

Dias's subsequent attempts to find the main fleet ended with him mistakenly sailing past Cape Guardafui and into the Gulf of Aden, waters as yet unsailed by Portuguese ships. Trapped by contrary winds, Dias spent several harrowing months in the area.  Battered by tempests, attacked by pirates and finally forced aground on the Eritrean coast, in a desperate search for water and food for his rapidly dying crew.  By the time he left there, Dias had only six crewmen left.

Unable to find Cabral, Diogo Dias' ship hobbled back home alone. Nicolau Coelho, leading the vanguard of Cabral's returning armada, finally stumbled upon the weary Dias at the watering stop of Bezeguiche (Bay of Dakar, Senegal) in June 1501.  They returned to Lisbon together.

See also
2nd Portuguese India Armada (Cabral, 1500)
Exploration of Asia

Explorers of Africa
15th-century births
16th-century deaths
Explorers of Asia
Portuguese explorers of South America
15th-century Portuguese people
16th-century Portuguese people
15th-century explorers